The Kurukkal are a caste in Kerala, India. Originally a patrilineal community of Travancore whose traditional function was that of temple owners, they became matrilineal towards the end of the 18th century under the influence of the dominant Nambudiri Brahmin caste. From that time on, Kurukkal women had hypergamous marriages with Nambudiri men and Kurukkal men struck similar relationships with women from the matrilineal Maran caste.

The community's position in the Hindu ritual ranking system known as varna is disputed. They generally claim to be Iyer Brahmins .

References 

Social groups of Kerala
Liturgical castes